Huntley Montgomery (born October 2, 1978) is a former professional tennis player from the United States.

Career
Montgomery contested 20 ATP Challenger finals during his career and won nine titles.

He played in four ATP Tour doubles tournaments but was unable to progress past the first round of any of them.

ATP Challenger and ITF Futures finals

Singles: 6 (2–4)

Doubles: 41 (22–19)

References

External links
 
 

1978 births
Living people
American male tennis players
21st-century American people